The Essex Vase is a greyhound racing competition held annually at Romford Greyhound Stadium. It was inaugurated in 1939 and ran until 1949. It was decided to bring the race back in 1959.

The 2017 version of the event was delayed and held in March 2018, the winner Murrys Act is officially listed as the 2017 winner. Mark Wallis has won the competition a record six times.

Past winners

Key
+2017 (delayed - event held in 2018)

Venues & Distances 
1939–present (Romford 575m)

Sponsors
1983-1989 (Charrington Brewery)
2002–present (Coral)

References

Greyhound racing competitions in the United Kingdom
Sport in the London Borough of Havering
Recurring sporting events established in 1939
Vase sports trophies